Hajjiabad (also Romanized as Ḩājjīābād, Hajīābād, and Hājiābād; also known as Haji Abad Nahar Khan and Kālateh-ye Ḩājjī) is a village in Baqeran Rural District of the Central District of Birjand County, South Khorasan province, Iran. At the 2006 National Census, its population was 1,821 in 495 households. The following census in 2011 counted 6,500 people in 1,846 households. The latest census in 2016 showed a population of 7,749 people in 2,078 households; it was the largest village in its rural district.

References 

Birjand County

Populated places in South Khorasan Province

Populated places in Birjand County